Sofía Victoria Olivera Trakimas (born 14 August 1991) is a Uruguayan footballer who plays as a goalkeeper for Argentine club UAI Urquiza and the Uruguay women's national team.

References

External links

1991 births
Living people
Footballers from Montevideo
Uruguayan women's footballers
Women's association football goalkeepers
C.A. Cerro players
Peñarol players
Uruguay women's international footballers
Uruguayan expatriate women's footballers
Uruguayan expatriate sportspeople in Argentina
Expatriate women's footballers in Argentina
Uruguayan women's futsal players